La Boca is an unincorporated community and census-designated place (CDP) in San Juan County, New Mexico, United States. It was first listed as a CDP prior to the 2020 census.

The CDP is in the northeast corner of the county, bordered to the north by La Plata County, Colorado. New Mexico State Road 511 passes through the community, leading south  to Navajo Dam. To the north, the road becomes Colorado State Highway 172, leading  to Ignacio.

La Boca is bordered to the east by Los Pinos River, which flows southward to join the San Juan River in Navajo Lake.

Demographics

Education
The school district is Aztec Municipal Schools. Aztec High School is the local high school.

References 

Census-designated places in San Juan County, New Mexico
Census-designated places in New Mexico